Allan McMahon (9 August 1954 – 23 May 2003), also known by the nickname of "Macca", was an Australian professional rugby league footballer and coach. He was an Australian test player and was a coach of the Canberra Raiders, Newcastle Knights and Illawarra Steelers.

Playing career
McMahon played a total of 148 games for the Balmain Tigers of whom he also captained on numerous occasion. He also played for the Newtown Jets, the Canberra Raiders and was a member of the 1978 Kangaroo tour squad.

Coaching career
After coaching the Raiders in their fifth season in 1986, McMahon was the first coach of the Knights, who joined the NSWRL in 1988. He resigned during the 1991 season, and later coached the Illawarra Steelers. Despite signing a three-year contract, he was sacked at the end of the 1996 season, his first at the club.

Allan McMahon died in May 2003, at his home in Wollongong, aged 48.

Sources

References

External links
 Profile at Illawarra Steelers tribute website

 

1954 births
2003 deaths
Australia national rugby league team players
Australian rugby league coaches
Australian rugby league players
Balmain Tigers players
Canberra Raiders captains
Canberra Raiders coaches
Canberra Raiders players
Featherstone Rovers players
Illawarra Steelers coaches
Newcastle Knights coaches
Newtown Jets players
People from the Illawarra
Rugby league fullbacks
Rugby league players from Wollongong